The United States Embassy in Libreville, Gabon was bombed on 5 March 1964 and again on 8 March.

Background
Two weeks before the bombings, Gabon had undergone an abortive coup d'état against its president, Leon M'ba. Following the attempted coup, some Gabonese mistakenly identified the United States as a co-conspirator in the attempted coup. Time asserted that French officials helped spread the rumor of American involvement in the coup.

Bombings
On 5 March, William F. Courtney, deputy chief of the embassy, received a call from a man identifying himself as DuPont and demanding all Americans leave Gabon. Two other phone calls threatening an imminent attack were received by the United States Information Service. During a rainstorm about 8:15 that night, a small bomb exploded outside the embassy. The explosion, which occurred at a time when the building was closed and locked, resulted in damage to the embassy sign and the cracking of two windows. 

Following the bombing, French Gabonese made more threatening phone calls to the embassy. A second bomb exploded roughly 50 feet from the embassy two nights later, causing no damage. A drive-by shooting, during which at least five rounds of buckshot were fired from a 12-gauge automatic shotgun, riddled the second story windows with over 30 holes. William Courtney, the American chargé d'affaires, noticed two Europeans in a Simca automobile drive past the embassy at roughly 9:20 PM, one hour before the shooting and bombing. An unnamed American official said that he saw a car circle the embassy 10 minutes after the bombing. Two Gabonese policemen were assigned to protect the building, and M'ba ordered an investigation into the bombings. He denounced the allegations against Americans, saying:

References

1964 in Gabon
Terrorist incidents in Africa in 1964
Attacks on diplomatic missions of the United States
Gabon–United States relations
United States
20th century in Libreville
Terrorist incidents in Gabon
Events in Libreville
Building bombings in Africa